Gheorghe Lazăr National College may refer to one of two educational institutions in Romania:

Gheorghe Lazăr National College (Bucharest)
Gheorghe Lazăr National College (Sibiu)